Second Nature is the fifth solo album (fourth studio album) by Margaret Urlich. Released in May 1999 in New Zealand, it achieved gold status and was her last album before her death in 2022. Second Nature was produced by Eddie Rayner from Split Enz and was recorded on and off over 12 months and involved musicians from Australia and New Zealand.  The album comprised cover versions of some of Urlich's favourite New Zealand songs that she grew up with. These included artists like Split Enz, Crowded House, Dave Dobbyn, Max Merritt, Shona Laing, Don McGlashan and Tim Finn.

Track listing 
Track listing and song credits adapted from Spotify.

Charts
Second Nature debuted at number 21 before peaking at number 11 in August 1999.

Certifications

References

1999 albums
Margaret Urlich albums